The EduSport Trophy is an annual international figure skating competition organized by the Romanian Skating Organization. It is held every January in Bucharest and Otopeni, Romania. Medals are awarded in the disciplines of men's singles and ladies' singles at various levels which may include senior, junior, novice (advanced, intermediate and basic; subcategories including) and below, as well as recreational and adult skaters.

Senior medalists

Men

Ladies

Junior medalists

Men

Ladies

Advanced novice medalists

Men

Ladies

References

External links 
 EduSport Trophy Official Homepage

International figure skating competitions hosted by Romania
Figure skating in Romania